Baicheng is a prefecture-level city in the northwestern part of Jilin province, People's Republic of China, bordering Inner Mongolia to the north and west and Heilongjiang to the east and northeast.

History
The area around present day Baicheng was a nomadic area which was inhabited by several nomad tribes in Northeast China as early as the Late Neolithic Age, including the Eastern Hu, the Xianbei, the Fuyu, and the Khitans once inhabited the area. During the Liao Dynasty, Baicheng was the political center of four emperors, including Emperor Shengzong, Emperor Xingzong, Emperor Daozong, and Emperor Tianzuo, as the seat of the local government was located at Chengsijiazi Ancient fort in today's Taobei District. As Qing Government forsook the settlement of Han Chinese in the 19th century, no farming was allowed until 1902. In 1904 Baicheng became a county going by the name of Jing'an. In 1914 Jing'an County was renamed Tao'an. By 1938 it was finally renamed Baicheng, which in Chinese means white town. The name's origin is the Mongolian name of the city Chaghanhot, which also means "white town". Baicheng used to belong to Nenjiang and Heilongjiang province, under the jurisdiction of the former provincial capital Qiqihar. In 1954, with the Heilongjiang Province merged with Songjiang Province, Baicheng was incorporated into Jilin Province.

Baicheng's importance started to increase after a railway from Qiqihar to Siping through Baicheng was constructed in the 1920s. In the 1930s another railway connecting Baicheng to Ulanhot and the mines at Arxan was opened northwestward. These two lines enabled Baicheng to become a regional transportation hub in western Jilin Province. One more rail line connecting Changchun was opened in the mid-1930s as well.

Geography

Topography
Baicheng is located in the eastern part of the Horqin Grassland, and situated in the northwestern part of Jilin Province. Bordering prefecture cities are:

Songyuan (SE)
Qiqihar (N)
Xingan League (W)

The eastern part of the Greater Khingan Mountains lies in the northwest of Baicheng. Grassland and wetlands are prominent throughout the city's southeastern part.

Climate

Baicheng has a rather dry, monsoon-influenced, humid continental climate (Köppen Dwa), with long (lasting from November to March), very cold, windy, but dry winters due to the influence of the Siberian high, and hot, humid summers, due to the East Asian monsoon. More than 70% of the annual precipitation falls from June to August alone. Drought conditions are common in spring and autumn; from 1961 to 2009, there were 31 years with spring drought and 28 with autumn drought.

Administrative divisions

Economy
Textile industry is one of the main pillars of the economy.
Agriculture of the area is centred on plantation of soy beans and oil plants. It is home to the Baicheng Weapons Test Centre.

Transportation

Railway

Baicheng railway station is a railway hub in western Jilin Province. It is the terminus of the Changchun–Baicheng railway. There are multiple daily departures to other cities including Beijing, Harbin, Changchun, Shenyang, Dalian, Qiqihar, Ulanhot and several other cities in northern provinces of China.

Road
Expressways:
 G4512 Shuangliao-Nenjiang Expressway
 G12 Hunchun-Ulanhot Expressway
 G47 Nenjiang-Dandong Expressway

National Highway (GXXX):
 China National Highway 302

Air
Baicheng Chang'an Airport is located in the town of Taohe in Taobei District,  from the city center. It has been under construction since October 26, 2012. The total investment is 480 million yuan. The airport was opened on 31 March 2017, the fifth civil airport in Jilin province. The airport has a runway that is 2,500 meters long and 45 meters wide (class 4C), and a 4,471 square-meter terminal building. It is designed to handle 200,000 passengers and 700 tons of cargo annually by 2020.

Sister cities
 Barnaul, Altai Krai, Russia

References

External links

 Government Province Website

 
Prefecture-level divisions of Jilin